SGS  (formerly Société Générale de Surveillance (French for General Society of Surveillance)) is a Swiss multinational company headquartered in Geneva, which provides inspection, verification, testing and certification services. Its 97,000 employees operate a network of 2,650 offices and laboratories worldwide. It ranked on Forbes Global 2000 in 2015, 2016, 2017, 2020 and 2021.

The core services offered by SGS include the inspection and verification of the quantity, weight and quality of traded goods, the testing of product quality and performance against various health, safety and regulatory standards, and to make sure that products, systems or services meet the requirements of standards set by governments, standardization bodies or by SGS customers.

History 
International traders in London, including those from France, Germany and the Netherlands, the Baltic, Hungary, the Mediterranean and the United States, founded the London Corn Trade Association in 1878 in order to standardize shipping documents for exporting nations and to clarify procedures and disputes relating to the quality of imported grain.

In the same year, SGS was founded in Rouen, France, by  Henri Goldstuck, a young Latvian immigrant who, having seen the opportunities at one of the country’s largest ports, began to inspect French grain shipments. With the aid of Captain Maxwell Shafftington, he borrowed money from an Austrian friend to start inspecting the shipments arriving in Rouen as, during transit, losses showed in the volume of grain as a result of shrinkage and theft. The service inspected and verified the quantity and quality of the grain on arrival with the importer.

Business grew rapidly; the two entrepreneurs went into business together in December 1878 and, within a year, had opened offices in Le Havre, Dunkirk and Marseilles.

In 1915, during the First World War, the company moved its headquarters from Paris to Geneva, Switzerland, and on July 19, 1919 the company adopted the name Société Générale de Surveillance.

During the mid-20th century, SGS started offering inspection, testing and verification services across a variety of sectors, including industrial, minerals and oil, gas and chemicals, among others. In 1981, the company went public. It is a component of the SMI MID Index.

Operations 
The company works in the following industries: agriculture and food, chemical, construction, consumer goods and retail, energy, finance, industrial manufacturing, life sciences, logistics, mining, oil and gas, public sector and transportation.

In 2004, in collaboration with SGS, the Institut d'Administration des Entreprises (IAE France University Management Schools) Network developed Qualicert, a tool for evaluating university management training and establishing a new international benchmark. The Qualcert accreditation was approved by the Ministry of Economy and Finance (France), the Directorate General of Higher Education (DGES) and the Conference of University Presidents (CPU). Focused on continuous quality improvement, Qualicert is now in its sixth revision.

Awards and recognition 
 Ranked by Forbes in 2017 as a Top Multinational Performer, and one of the World’s Most Innovative Companies.
 Named Professional Services industry leader in the Dow Jones Sustainability Indices World and Europe for six consecutive years between 2014-2019, receiving a score of 83/100, in comparison to the sector average of 38/100.
 In 2015, KPMG ranked the company's Code of Integrity in the top ten among Swiss companies. The company also joined RE100, a global group of companies convened by The Climate Group and Carbon Disclosure Project that aims to generate their energy fully from renewable sources.

Notes

References

External links

Service companies of Switzerland
Companies based in Geneva
Multinational companies headquartered in Switzerland
Commercial laboratories
Product certification
Companies established in 1878
Product-testing organizations
Laboratories in Switzerland
Swiss companies established in 1878
Companies listed on the SIX Swiss Exchange